Daniel-Constantin Barbu (born 21 May 1957) is a Romanian political scientist, publisher, essayist, journalist, and professor at the University of Bucharest's Faculty of Political Science. The head of the Research Institute at the University of Bucharest, and former dean of the Faculty, he was also director of Realitatea Românească, a daily newspaper, in 1991–1992. Barbu worked as a State Adviser for President Emil Constantinescu between 1997 and 1999. He is the author as of June 2007 of eight books and many more articles on political science, and a contributor to the magazine Sfera Politicii. He is also a member of the Romanian Senate from Bucharest and former Minister of Culture.

Biography

Early years
Barbu was born in Bucharest, and graduated from the Nicolae Bălcescu High School (the present-day Saint Sava National College) in 1976. In 1976, the Union of Communist Youth, official youth organization in Communist Romania, refused to grant him permission to attend either the Faculty of History-Philosophy or that of Law. Consequently, Barbu attended Art History in Cluj-Napoca, at the present-day Babeş-Bolyai University, graduating in 1980. He then was employed as a curator at the Village Museum (1980) and the National Museum of Romanian History (1981–1986). Between 1987 and 1992, he was a researcher at Bucharest University's Institute of South-Eastern European Studies.

Post-1989
After the Romanian Revolution of 1989, he took doctoral training in Germany, at the University of Fribourg's Faculty of Theology; he received a PhD in history from the Babeş-Bolyai University in 1991. In 1999, he took a second doctorate, in Philosophy, from the University of Bucharest, where he has been teaching since 1991.

Between 1990 and 1991, he was head of Editura Meridiane, a prestigious Bucharest-based publishing house.

Barbu was the Dean of the Political Science Department of the University of Bucharest from 1994 to 2000, and then again from 2002 to 2004. Since 2004, he has been the Political Science Chair of the Political Science Department of the University of Bucharest.

He has been a visiting professor at the École des hautes études en sciences sociales in Paris, the La Sapienza University in Rome, the National and Kapodistrian University of Athens, Pittsburg State University, Jackson State University, and many others.

Barbu has specialized in the Comparative History of European Civilizations, Political Science and Comparative Political Science, Social and Political Models of the State, Minorities and Confessional Groups in Romania, Constitutions, Government, and Politics in Europe, Totalitarian Regimes, Communisme et Socialisme d'État, and Political Anthropology.

In 2004, the European Anti-fraud Office (OLAF) notified the Romanian Government about irregularities found in a Phare programme headed by Daniel Barbu, as dean of the Faculty of Political Science. The event was reported by an article on the BBC Romanian service on 5 May and appeared in the Daily Bulletin of the Romanian Ministry of Foreign Affairs a day later. According to both sources, the program engulfed over 200,000 euros coming from PHARE TEMPUS grant money into civil servant training courses which never took place and which had nonexistent people enrolled. In an interview during the 2012 Parliament election campaign, as candidate from the Social-Liberal Union, Daniel Barbu dubbed the event as a misunderstanding and a "no penal matter". As a result of the 2012 Romanian parliamentary elections, Daniel Barbu has been designated the new Romanian Minister of Culture, ironically, by the same person who in 2004 headed the Government's Control Department, Victor Ponta, department which investigated the OLAF notifications.

Latest works

 Die abwesende Republik [The Absent Republic], Frank & Timme, Berlin, 2009.
 Politica pentru barbari [Politics for the Barbarians], Nemira, Bucharest, 2005.
 Republica absentă. Politică şi societate în România postcomunistă [The Absent Republic. Politics and Society in Post-Communist Romania], 2nd edition (revisited), Nemira, Bucharest, 2004.
 Bizanţ contra Bizanţ. Explorări în cultura politică românească [Byzantium contra Byzantium. Exploring Romanian political culture], Nemira, Bucharest, 2001 (1st ed. 1999).
 O arheologie constituțională românească. Studii şi documente [A Romanian constitutional archeology. Studies and documents], Editura Universităţii din București, București, 2000. 
 Byzance, Rome et les Roumains. Essais sur la production politique de la foi au Moyen Âge [Byzantium, Rome, and the Romanians. Essays on the political production of faith in the Middle Ages], Éditions Babel, Bucarest, 1998.
 Şapte teme de politică românească [Seven Themes of Romanian Politics], Antet, Bucharest, 1997.
 Au cetăţenii suflet? O teologie politică a societăţilor post-seculare, Editura Vremea, București, 2016.

References

  Profile at the University of Bucharest site. Retrieved 5 July 2007
  Profile at the Faculty of Political Sciences (University of Bucharest)

External links

 Daniel Barbu, Political Science in Romania, Country Report 1, at the Knowledge Base Social Sciences in Eastern Europe.
  [Profile at the Faculty of Political Sciences (University of Bucharest)]. Retrieved October 2010.
  Profile at the University of Bucharest site. Retrieved 5 July 2007
 Ion Cordoneanu, Marius Velică, Religion and Modernity in the Romanian Public Space, paper presented at the conference "Secularism and Beyond – Comparative Perspectives" (29 May – 1 June 2007) at the University of Copenhagen (references to the works of Daniel Barbu).
 Marius Jucan, Review of: Daniel Barbu, Politica pentru barbari, Nemira, Bucharest, 2005, in Journal For the Study of Religions and Ideologies, no. 13, Spring 2006.

Babeș-Bolyai University alumni
Romanian curators
Romanian publishers (people)
Romanian essayists
21st-century Romanian historians
Romanian newspaper editors
Romanian political scientists
Romanian sociologists
University of Bucharest alumni
Academic staff of the University of Bucharest
Jackson State University faculty
Saint Sava National College alumni
1957 births
Living people
Academic staff of the National and Kapodistrian University of Athens
University of Fribourg alumni